After the Lion, Jackals is an episode of Bob Hope Presents the Chrysler Theatre directed by Stanford Whitmore and starring Stanley Baker.

References

External links

1960s adventure films
1966 films